Trevilder is a farm in the parish of Egloshayle, Cornwall, England, UK.

See also

 List of farms in Cornwall

References

Farms in Cornwall